Burslem was a borough constituency in Stoke-on-Trent which returned one Member of Parliament (MP) to the House of Commons of the Parliament of the United Kingdom. Elections were held using the first past the post voting system.

Boundaries 
The County Borough of Stoke-on-Trent wards numbers one, two, three, four, five, six, seven and eight.

The constituency was created for the 1918 general election, and abolished for the 1950 general election. From 1885 to 1918 the Stoke-on-Trent area had been divided into two constituencies: Stoke and Hanley. In 1918, the area was divided into three constituencies: Stoke, Hanley and a new seat called Burslem. Burslem was thus made up from part of the former Stoke seat and part of Hanley.

History 
Until 1918, both Stoke and Hanley had been represented by Liberal MPs. The Liberal Party in the area was heavily influenced by support for radical land reform policies such as Site Value Rating and the Single Tax policy. These policies were advocated by R.L. Outhwaite, the MP for Hanley and Josiah Wedgwood, the MP for neighbouring Newcastle-under-Lyme. After 1918, they both left the Liberal Party and joined the Labour Party. There they influenced Andrew MacLaren. who was for many years the standard-bearer for the Labour Party and an advocate of Site Value Rating. At the 1931 general election, the supporters of land reform were split when MacLaren was opposed by a candidate who advocated a Single Tax policy. He returned to Parliament in 1935, but left the Labour Party in 1943 and sought re-election as an Independent.

When Outhwaite and Wedgwood left the Liberal Party in 1919, those who remained made the Liberal Party less radical. For the next 20 years the Liberal Party and the Unionist Party experimented with different approaches to electoral politics, often coming together to support the same candidate, as in 1922, 1924, 1931 and 1935.

Members of Parliament

Election results

Elections in the 1910s

Elections in the 1920s

Elections in the 1930s

Elections in the 1940s
General Election 1939–40

Another General Election was scheduled to take place before the end of 1940. In 1939 the parties were preparing for an election, and by the end of that year, the following candidates had been selected: 
Labour: Andrew MacLaren

References 

Parliamentary constituencies in Stoke-on-Trent (historic)
Constituencies of the Parliament of the United Kingdom established in 1918
Constituencies of the Parliament of the United Kingdom disestablished in 1950